St Dominic is a c. 1475 tempera and gold on panel painting, now in the Uffizi Gallery in Florence.

It originated in the Canonici collection in Ferrara, from which it was acquired by professor Giuseppe Grassi in 1905. It forms part of a split-up altarpiece and relates to another five fragments of similar dimensions and style, which may have come from a single altarpiece or several. Most art historians assign St Dominic to the San Giacomo in Argenta altarpiece (Mario Salmi, 1957, Nalajoli, 1974) or the San Luca in Borgo altarpiece in Ferrara (Roberto Longhi, 1934, Adolfo Venturi, 1914, and Ricci).

Emma Micheletti relates the work to the same artist's St Anthony of Padua in the Louvre and St James the Great Enthroned in the Musée des Beaux-Arts in Caen. Longhi also linked it to St Sebastian (Berlin), St Christopher (Berlin) and the Madonna in the collection of the Accademia Carrara in Bergamo, with the Berlin works forming side panels to the Bergamo panel. Monica Molteni (1999) decisively denied the links to the Berlin and Bergamo works, whilst Joseph Manca (2000) also raised doubts over such links, arguing that their supports did not match that of the Paris panel, the nearest in style to the St Dominic.

References

1475 paintings
Paintings in the collection of the Uffizi
Tura
Paintings by Cosmè Tura